Skrikjofossen (also called Krikjofossen) is a waterfall in Ullensvang Municipality in Vestland county, Norway. It tumbles down from the Hardanger Plateau.

Gallery

See also 
 List of waterfalls
 List of waterfalls by type

References

Ullensvang
Waterfalls of Vestland